General judgment is the Christian theological concept of a judgment of the dead. When the individual dies, general judgment holds that the person's final dispensation will await the general judgment of the dead at the end of the world, rather than be judged immediately. It is generally contrasted with a particular judgment right after death. It is related closely to Judgment Day and often is just another phrase for the Last Judgment or Final Judgement.

In the Bible
Jesus provided examples and illustrations of judgments against cities and generations. Jesus warned his contemporaries that the men of Nineveh, who repented at the preaching of Jonah,  and the Queen of the South would testify against them in the judgment. In the same speech, Jesus declared woes upon the cities of Chorazin and Bethsaida declaring that the cities of Sodom, Tyre, and Sidon would have a more tolerable outcome in the judgement.

Catholic view
The position is hinted at in several places in both the Old and in the New Testament, and the Catholic Encyclopedia says (here referring to the Last Judgment) "Few truths are more often or more clearly proclaimed in Scripture than that of the general judgment".

A decisive factor in the Last Judgment will be the question of whether the corporal works of mercy were practiced during a lifetime or not. They rate as important acts of charity. Therefore, and according to the biblical sources (Matthew 5:31-46), the conjunction of the Last Judgment and the works of mercy is very frequent in the pictorial tradition of Christian art.

See also 
 Divine judgment
 Judgement (afterlife)
 Pre-advent judgment

Further reading

References

Judgment in Christianity
Christian terminology